Etienne Girardot (22 February 1856 – 10 November 1939) was a diminutive stage and film actor of Anglo-French parentage born in London, England.

Biography
The son of French painter Ernest Gustave Girardot, he studied at an art school, but left at age seventeen to go on stage. Having played in the provinces, he made his debut on the London stage at the Haymarket Theatre. He went to America in 1893, where he continued his career. He was a success, with numerous Broadway shows to his credit, including the 1893 production of Charley's Aunt, in which he played Lord Fancourt Babberley for three years.

He also worked in film, both silents and talkies, debuting in 1911 in Intrepid Davy. Among his film roles were the harmless lunatic who fancies himself a millionaire in the 1934 screwball comedy Twentieth Century, with John Barrymore and Carole Lombard, and the harassed coroner in three murder mysteries starring William Powell as detective Philo Vance.

Girardot died after a short stay in the hospital. He was survived by his wife Dr. Violetta Shelton, an "eye, ear, nose and throat specialist."

Complete filmography

Intrepid Davy (1911 short)
Her Hero (1911 short)
An Innocent Burglar (1911 short) as The Real Burglar
A Slight Mistake (1911 short)
One Touch of Nature (1911 short) as Mr. Grochberg - the Jewish Father, the Rabbi
Nicholas Nickleby (1912 short) as Gryde
Beau Brummel (1913 short) as Isadore - Brummel's Valet
Betty in the Lions' Den (1913 short)
Up in a Balloon (1913 short) as The Minister
Goodness Gracious (1913 short)
Bunny's Birthday (1914 short) as Neighbor Smith
A Good Little Devil (1914) as Old Nick Jr.
The Hall-Room Rivals (1914 short) as 2nd Sea Captain
Cherry (1914 short)
Too Many Husbands (1914 short) as Chauncey Chilton
The Violin of Monsieur (1914 short) as Pere Gerome
Pigs Is Pigs (1914 short)
Bread Upon the Waters (1914 short) as Jean
David Garrick (1914 short)
The New Stenographer (1914 short) as Mr. Brown
The Barrel Organ (1914 short) as Bunions - the Organ Grinder
Underneath the Paint (1914 short) as William Marsh
The Treason of Anatole (1915 short) as Anatole
Mary's Duke (1915 short) as Duke d'Enfetti
Uncle John (1915 short) as Uncle John Waldron - the Landlord
The Broken Toy (1915 short) as Sylvain - the Dancing Instructor
The Blank Page (1915 short) as The Scientist
The Toy-Maker of Leyden (1915 short) as Martha's Father - the Toy-Maker
Circus Mary (1915 short)
Artie, the Millionaire Kid (1916) as The widow
The Belle of New York (1919)
The Witness for the Defense (1919) as Richard Pettifer
A Stage Romance (1922) as Salomon
Storm at Daybreak (1933) as Hungarian Officer (uncredited)
The Kennel Murder Case (1933) as Dr. Doremus
Blood Money (1933) as Bail Bond Clerk
Mandalay (1934) as Mr. Abernathie
Fashions of 1934 (1934) as Glass
Twentieth Century (1934) as Mathew J. Clark
Born to Be Bad (1934) as J. K. Brown - Claim Adjustor (uncredited)
Little Man, What Now? (1934) as Spannfuss
Return of the Terror (1934) as Mr. Tuttle
The Dragon Murder Case (1934) as Dr. Doremus
The Firebird (1934) as Prof. Peterson
Clive of India (1935) as Mr. Warburton
Grand Old Girl (1935) as Mellis
The Whole Town's Talking (1935) as Seaver
Chasing Yesterday (1935) as M. Mouche
Hooray for Love (1935) as Judge Peterby
Curly Top (1935) as Mr. Wyckoff
The Bishop Misbehaves (1935) as Brooke
I Live My Life (1935) as Professor
Metropolitan (1935) as Nello
In Old Kentucky (1935) as Pluvius J. Aspinwall, the Rainmaker
The Garden Murder Case (1936) as Dr. Doremus
The Music Goes 'Round (1936) as Brewster
Half Angel (1936) as Dr. Alexander Cotton
Hearts Divided (1936) as Du Fresne
The Devil Is a Sissy (1936) as Principal
The Longest Night (1936) as Kendrick Kinney
Go West, Young Man (1936) as Prof. Herbert Rigby
College Holiday (1936) as Prof. Hercules Dove
The Road Back (1937) as Mayor
Wake Up and Live (1937) as Waldo Peebles
Danger – Love at Work (1937) as Albert Pemberton
Breakfast for Two (1937) as Mr. Meggs
The Great Garrick (1937) as Jean Cabot
Professor Beware (1938) as Judge Henry Pitts (uncredited)
Port of Seven Seas (1938) as Bruneau
Having Wonderful Time (1938) as Mr. G (scenes deleted)
There Goes My Heart (1938) as Hinkley - Secretary
The Arizona Wildcat (1939) as Judge White
Fast and Loose (1939) as Christopher Oates
The Story of Vernon and Irene Castle (1939) as Papa Aubel
For Love or Money (1939) as Poindexte
Exile Express (1939) as Caretaker
Hawaiian Nights (1939) as Alonzo Dilman
Little Accident (1939) as Professor Artemus Glenwater
The Hunchback of Notre Dame (1939) as Doctor
Isle of Destiny (1940) as "Doc" Spriggs

References

External links

 
 
 
 A photo of Girardot in the play Charley's Aunt in the New York Public Library's Digital Collection

1856 births
1939 deaths
19th-century English male actors
20th-century English male actors
English people of French descent
British expatriate male actors in the United States
English male film actors
English male stage actors
Burials at Hollywood Forever Cemetery
Male actors from London